Solitaire is a 2001 solo album by pianist Uri Caine. It was released on the Winter & Winter label.

Reception

In his review for AllMusic, David R. Adler notes that "Solitaire, the first solo piano album by Uri Caine, is a tour de force… Here, with nothing but 88 keys to work with, he makes music as electrifying as anything in his catalog". On All About Jazz C. Michael Bailey said "The music is a bit indescribable, as its depth and breath are immense. Suffice it to say that the recording is a bit like an  Classical recital where the performer has a stream-of-consciousness conversation with the instrument and we, the audience, are eaves-dropping".

Track listing
All compositions by Uri Caine unless otherwise indicated.
 "Say It in French" - 3:23  
 "As I Am" - 3:27  
 "Roll On" - 5:19  
 "Sonia Said" - 4:51  
 "Beartoes" - 4:53  
 "Inhaling You" - 4:09  
 "Hamsin" - 4:20  
 "Solitaire" - 5:22  
 "The Call" - 6:20  
 "Snort" - 3:52  
 "All the Way" (Sammy Cahn, Jimmy Van Heusen) - 4:15  
 "Twelve" - 3:53  
 "Blackbird" (John Lennon, Paul McCartney) - 6:03  
 "Anaconda" - 5:35  
 "Country Life" - 2:25

Personnel
Uri Caine - piano

References

Solo piano jazz albums
Winter & Winter Records albums
Uri Caine albums
2001 albums